The Faculty of Architecture and the Built Environment at TU Delft (abbr. BK ) is the largest faculty of TU Delft with around 2,900 students. It is also one of the top faculties in the world: it was ranked 2nd in the world's top universities for architecture & built environment in the QS World University Rankings by Subject 2020, following the Massachusetts Institute of Technology (MIT), and 3rd in 2015, 2017 and 2018 an 2019.

History
On January 8, 1842, King Willem II founded the 'Royal Academy for the education of civilian engineers, for serving both nation and industry, and of apprentices for trade'. On June 20, 1864, a Royal Decree was issued, ordering that the Royal Academy in Delft be disbanded in order to make way for a new 'Polytechnic School'. The School went on to educate architects, and engineers in the fields of civil works, shipbuilding, mechanical engineering and mining. STYLOS, the Student Association for architectural students in the faculty, was established in 1894 and is one of the biggest in the Netherlands.

Building
In 2008, the faculty of Architecture almost completely burned down in a fire. The current building is TU Delft's former main building.

Chair Collection
The Faculty is home to a famous chair collection. It was originally housed in the old building and it narrowly escaped destruction in the fire in which that building burned down. Having so narrowly escaped the fire, the value of the collection became much more apparent. The free-to-enter museum showcasing a large collection of chairs throughout history, is currently housed as a permanent exhibit in the new faculty building.

INDESEM 
INDESEM (International Design Seminar) is a student-led workshop that has been organised more than 20 times at the Faculty in Delft. The first edition happened in 1964, when Dutch architect Aldo van Eyck was appointed professor. After another edition in 1967, the seminar wasn't held until Herman Hertzberger re-initiated it in 1985. Ever since, it was organised biennially or annually. 

The most recent edition was held in 2021 and was called DATASCAPE and invited students to think about the role of data in architecture.

BkBeats
 started in 1972 when it was called 'Bouwkundefeest' and was hosted at the faculty then also, however back then it was the old faculty which burned down in 2008. Since then it is hosted in the new faculty building. It is the largest student festival hosted in an educational faculty in the Netherlands. It is hosted biennially, and organised by STYLOS, one of the faculties student organisations. The festival is so popular that it has been sold out many consecutive editions to date. As of the 2018 edition of the event, regular tickets costed 16 euro. For the festival the faculty is rebuilt from the inside and the festival takes place inside the faculty building.

Courses
The Faculty offers the following degrees:

 Bachelor of Science in Architecture 
 Master of Science in Architecture, Urbanism and Building Sciences
 Master of Science in Geomatics for the Built Environment
 Master in Architecture with specialisations in: Architectural Design Crossovers, Architectural Engineering, Architecture and Dwelling, Architecture and Public Building, Borders and Territories, Complex Projects, Heritage and Architecture, Interiors Buildigs Cities, Methods of Analysis and Imagination, Urban Architecture, City of the Future, Explore Lab, Veldacademie
 Master in Urbanism with specialisations in Planning complex cities, Transitional territories, Design of urban fabrics, Urban metabolism & climate and Urban ecology & Eco-cities.
 Master in Building Technology with specialisations in Climate, Facade and Structural Design
 Master in Management of the Built Environment (MBE) with specialisations in Design & Construction Management, Real Estate Management, and Housing
 Master in Landscape Architecture
 PhD in Architecture and the Built Environment

People
The following are associated with the Faculty.

Notable graduates
 Jo van den Broek
 Erick van Egeraat
 
 Herman Hertzberger
 Kas Oosterhuis
 Francine Houben
 Winy Maas, Jacob van Rijs and Nathalie de Vries (MVRDV)
 Frits Peutz

Notable faculty
 Jacob B. Bakema, Dutch architect
 Jo Coenen, Dutch architect
 Cornelis van Eesteren, Dutch architect and urban planner
 Aldo van Eyck, Dutch architect
 Tony Fretton, British architect
 Herman Hertzberger, Dutch architect
 Rem Koolhaas, Dutch architect
 Marinus Jan Granpré Molière, Dutch urban designer and planner
 Kas Oosterhuis, Dutch architect
 Bob Van Reeth, Belgian architect
 Alexander Tzonis, Greek architect, researcher, and author

Student organisations
With a large international student presence, there are various specialist associations linked to the Faculty of Architecture and the Built Environment. These include a study association for students and an alumni association, as well as several active practical associations.

 Stylos: Established in 1894, the Architecture study association has more than 2,100 members and around 100 active committee members.
 Argus: The Architecture master Student Association of the Faculty of Architecture at Delft University of Technology
 Polis: Platform for Urbanism and Landscape Architecture is the study association for Master students of the Faculty of Architecture specialising in urbanism and landscape architecture
 Boss: the student association linked to the department of Management in the Built Environment (MBE). It was established in 1993 at the faculty of Architecture
 BouT: the student and practice association for Building Technology of the Faculty of Architecture
 Forum: Forum Housing Association is an association which aims to stimulate discussion about living and housing as part of the Real Estate and Housing specialization
GEOS:  Study association of the M.Sc Geomatics Programme.
INDESEM: organises the International Design Seminar and other events about Architecture related topics, approximately every two years

References

External links
 TU Delft – Faculty of Architecture website

1904 establishments in the Netherlands
Educational institutions established in 1904
Architecture schools
Faculty of Architecture
Museums in South Holland